Sangwonsa is a Buddhist temple located in Pyeongchang County, Gangwon-do, South Korea.

See also
 Bell of Sangwonsa

References

External links 
Official website 

Buddhist temples in South Korea
Buddhist temples of the Jogye Order
Pyeongchang County
Buildings and structures in Gangwon Province, South Korea